Mu Telescopii, Latinized from μ Telescopii is a solitary star in the southern constellation Telescopium. It has an apparent visual magnitude of 6.28, placing it near the limit of naked eye visibility.

Mu Telescopii has a stellar classification of F5 V, indicating that it is an ordinary F-type main sequence star. It has been noted to be chromospherically active.

It has been observed for infrared excess suggesting the presence of a debris disk but so far, none has been found.

References

F-type main-sequence stars
Telescopii, Mu
Telescopium (constellation)
PD-55 08188
183028
095932
7393
Telescopii, 61